Alejo Vidal-Quadras Roca (born 20 May 1945 in Barcelona) is a Spanish politician and radiation physicist who served as a Member of the European Parliament from 1999 to 2014 and served as First Vice President of the European Parliament from 2004 to 2007.

He was elected on the People's Party ticket and sat with the European People's Party group. 
In 2014, he announced that he was leaving the People's Party for a new party, Vox. He was the frontrunner for Vox in the 2014 European election, but the party failed to win a seat.

It was through his contacts in the National Council of Resistance of Iran (NCRI) that the party received about one million euros to bootstrap its campaign.
After its 2014 failure, Vidal-Quadras operated  the International Committee in Search of Justice, a Brussels-based lobby supporting the NCRI against the Iranian government. He is a member of the European Friends of Israel, a lobby group aiming to defend Israel's interests within the European Union.

Alejo Vidal-Quadras defines himself as liberal-conservative. He is opposed to abortion rights and gay marriage.

He currently lives off his pensions as a former university professor and a former member of the European Parliament.

In addition to serving in the European Parliament, he has occupied several elected positions in Spain: he was a member of the Barcelona City Council (1987–1991), member of the Parliament of Catalonia (1988–1996) and Senator in the Spanish Senate (1996–1999).

References

1945 births
Living people
People from Barcelona
Members of the Parliament of Catalonia
Members of the Senate of Spain
MEPs for Spain 1999–2004
MEPs for Spain 2004–2009
MEPs for Spain 2009–2014
Vox (political party) politicians
Members of the 5th Parliament of Catalonia